The 1989 Air Canada Cup was Canada's 11th annual national midget 'AAA' hockey championship, which was played in April 1989 at Memorial Stadium in St. John's, Newfoundland.  In a rematch of the previous year's gold medal game, the Calgary Buffaloes defeated the defending champion Regina Pat Canadians to win the gold medal. The Wexford Raiders from Ontario won the bronze.

Teams

Round robin

Standings

Scores

Wexford 7 - St. John's 4
Ste-Foy 7 - Antigonish 0
Regina 6 - Calgary 2
Antigonish 4 - St. John's 0
Wexford 3 - Ste-Foy 2
Regina 7 - St. John's 1
Calgary 3 - Ste. Foy 1
Wexford 3 - Antigonish 2
Calgary 6 - St. John's 1
Ste-Foy 6 - Regina 2
Wexford 3 - Calgary 2
Ste-Foy 5 - St. John'[s 1
Wexford 2 - Regina 1
Calgary 5 - Antigonish 0

Playoffs

Semi-finals
Calgary 5 - Wexford 4
Regina 3 - Ste-Foy 2

Bronze-medal game
Wexford 7 - Ste-Foy 2

Gold-medal game
Calgary 4 - Regina 3

Individual awards
Most Valuable Player: Steve Smith (Wexford)
Most Sportsmanlike Player: Kelly Harper (Wexford)

See also
Telus Cup

References

External links
Telus Cup Website
Hockey Canada-Telus Cup Guide and Record Book

Telus Cup
Air Canada Cup
Sport in St. John's, Newfoundland and Labrador
April 1989 sports events in Canada